Duke of Cornwall is a title in the Peerage of England, traditionally held by the eldest son of the reigning British monarch, previously the English monarch. The duchy of Cornwall was the first duchy created in England and was established by a royal charter in 1337. Prince William became Duke of Cornwall following the accession of his father, King Charles III, to the throne in 2022, and his wife, Catherine, became Duchess of Cornwall.

Legend
Some folk  histories of the British Isles, such as Geoffrey of Monmouth's History of the Kings of Britain (1136), claim that the first leader of Cornwall was Corineus, a Trojan warrior and ally of Brutus of Troy, portrayed as the original settler of the British Isles. From then through the Arthurian period, such legendary dukes of Cornwall stood apart from the high-king of Britain, while serving as his closest ally and, at times, as his protector (all per Monmouth's collected yarns). Notably in this tale, Gorlois, duke of Cornwall under King Uther Pendragon, rebelled when the king became obsessed with Gorlois' wife Igraine. Uther killed Gorlois and took Igraine: the son was King Arthur.

History
The historical record suggests that, following the Anglo-Saxon settlement of Britain, Cornwall formed part of a separate Kingdom of Dumnonia, which included Devon, although there is evidence that it may have had its own rulers at times. The Celtic southwest of Britain was gradually conquered by the emerging Germanic Kingdom of England, and after the Norman Conquest in 1066 the new rulers of England appointed their own men as earl of Cornwall, the first of whom was in fact a Breton of Cornouaille in Brittany.

Edward of Woodstock (widely known as 'The Black Prince'), the eldest son of Edward III, was made the first duke of Cornwall in 1337, after Edward III had lost the title of duke of Normandy. Cornwall was the first dukedom conferred within the Kingdom of England.

Succession
The charter that established the estate on 17 March 1337 set out the rule that the duke and possessor of the estate would be the eldest son and heir apparent of the monarch. There were some deviations from this rule until a legal case (the Prince's Case) in 1606, which held that the rule should be adhered to.

When the estate is without a duke, the possessor is the monarch, even if the former duke left surviving descendants. The monarch's grandson, even if he is the heir apparent, does not succeed to the dukedom. Similarly, no female may ever be duke of Cornwall, even if she is heir presumptive or heir apparent (this being a distinct and even likely possibility in the future after the passage of the Succession to the Crown Act 2013), although a queen regnant without a son would be the de facto duke. However, if a duke of Cornwall should die without descendants (and also no sister between the two brothers if the younger one was born after 28 October 2011), his next brother obtains the duchy, this brother being both the oldest living son and heir apparent.

It is possible for an individual to be prince of Wales and heir apparent without being duke of Cornwall. The title 'prince of Wales' is the traditional title of the heir apparent to the throne, granted at the discretion of the sovereign (not automatically) and is not restricted to the eldest son.

For example, after the death of Frederick, Prince of Wales, George II's heir apparent was his grandson George (Frederick's eldest son and the future George III). The young Prince George was created prince of Wales but did not become duke of Cornwall because he was the king's grandson, rather than his son. When the sovereign has no legitimate son, or when the heir apparent is not the sovereign's son, the estates of the duchy of Cornwall revert to the Crown until a legitimate son is born or until the accession of a new monarch who has a son.

James Francis Edward Stuart, son of James II, was born duke of Cornwall in 1688. Although his father lost the throne, James Francis Edward was not deprived of his own titles and honours as a result of his father's deposition. Instead, from the (prevailing) Hanoverian perspective, it was as a result of his claiming his father's lost thrones that James was attainted for treason on 2 March 1702, and his titles were thus forfeited under English law.  However, from the (minority) Jacobite perspective, on his father's death in 1701 the duchy of Cornwall was merged with the Crown.

Rights of the duke

The duchy includes over 220 square miles (570 square kilometres) of land, more than half of which lies in Devon. The duke has some rights over the territory of Cornwall, and for this and other reasons there is debate as to the constitutional status of Cornwall. The High Sheriff of Cornwall is appointed by the duke, not the monarch, in contrast to the other counties of England and Wales. The duke has the right to the estates of all those who die without named heirs (bona vacantia) in the whole of Cornwall.  In 2013, the duchy had a revenue surplus of £19 million, a sum that was exempt from income tax, though Prince Charles, the duke, chose to pay the tax voluntarily.

Until 2011, if there was no duke of Cornwall at any time, the income of the duchy went to the Crown. Under the Sovereign Grant Act 2011, revenues of the duchy of Cornwall pass to the heir to the throne, whether or not he is the duke of Cornwall. When the heir is a minor, 10% of revenues pass to him, with the balance passing to the Crown; the Sovereign Grant is reduced by the same amount.

Arms

The coat of arms of the duke of Cornwall is blazoned as sable, fifteen bezants, that is, a black field bearing fifteen golden discs. The arms are now used as a badge by the prince of Wales, and they appear below the shield in his coat of arms, along with his other badges.

The arms were adopted late in the 15th century, based on the arms of Richard, Earl of Cornwall. The bezants in Richard's arms were intended to represent peas, known in French as pois, as a punning reference to the French region of Poitou, of which he was count.

On 21 June 1968 a royal warrant augmented the aforementioned arms with the heir apparent's coronet, which consists of four crosses patée and four fleurs-de-lises with one arch (used only by the prince of Wales). The supporters are two Cornish choughs, each supporting an ostrich feather. The motto used with the arms is Houmout, meaning "High-spirited", the personal motto of the Black Prince.

Dukes of Cornwall, 1337 creation
All dukes of Cornwall who have been the eldest living son of the sovereign are generally considered to have held the same creation of the dukedom. The following is a table of these dukes of Cornwall, with the processes by which they became duke and by which they ceased to hold the title:

Dukes of Cornwall, 1376 creation
When his heir apparent, Edward of Woodstock, Prince of Wales and Duke of Cornwall, predeceased  him, Edward III granted a new creation of the title 'duke of Cornwall' to his grandson, Richard of Bordeaux. When he acceded the throne as Richard II in 1377, this creation merged with the Crown.
Richard of Bordeaux (1367–1400)
also Prince of Wales and Earl of Chester (1376)

Dukes of Cornwall, 1460 creation
When Richard Plantagenet, Duke of York pressed his claim to the throne, he was made heir apparent to Henry VI by the Act of Accord. On 31 October 1460, he was made prince of Wales and earl of Chester, duke of Cornwall and Lord Protector of England. Since he was not the eldest living son of the monarch, this creation was outside the terms of the 1337 warrant; York died in battle two months later, on 30 December 1460.
Richard Plantagenet (1411–1460)
also Lord Protector of England, Prince of Wales and Earl of Chester (1460, see Act of Accord); Duke of York (1385), Earl of Ulster (1264), Earl of March (1328), Earl of Cambridge (1414, restored 1426), feudal Lord of Clare (bt. 1066–1075), Baron Mortimer of Wigmore (1331)

Jacobite duke
Charles Edward Stuart ('The Young Pretender'), eldest son and heir apparent of James Francis Edward Stuart ('The Old Pretender'), was born in Rome on 31 December 1720, and shortly after his birth, he was declared prince of Wales, duke of Cornwall and earl of Chester in the Jacobite succession. With the death of the Old Pretender on 1 January 1766, he acceded to his father's claim to be King of England, Scotland, France, and Ireland. He died on 31 January 1788.

Family tree

See also

Cornish Foreshore Case (19th century arbitration about the ownership of minerals and mines under the foreshore of Cornwall)
Duchy Originals (the duchy's organic produce brand)
Duke of Rothesay
Duchess of Cornwall
Outline of Cornwall

Notes

External links

Duchy of Cornwall website – Duke of Cornwall
The Prince of Wales's website – Duchy of Cornwall
Guardian Unlimited article
Celtic Frontier or County Boundary? Competing discourses of a late nineteenth century British border link dead
The charter of 1337

 
Dukedoms in the Peerage of England
Duchy of Cornwall
Heirs to the throne
History of Cornwall
Succession to the British crown
British landowners
British and Irish peerages which merged in the Crown
Noble titles created in 1337
Noble titles created in 1376
William, Prince of Wales